Zio may refer to the following:

 Zio, Togo, a prefecture in southern Togo
 Zio Prefecture, Maritime Region of Togo
 Kyocera Zio (stylized ZIO), a 3G smartphone
 Toyota Mark X ZiO, a crossover vehicle sold in Japan
 Zio, a character from the video game Phantasy Star IV
 Zonal Informatics Olympiad of the Indian Computing Olympiad
 Kamen Rider Zi-O, a Japanese tokusatsu drama series
 a pejorative term for Zionists